Komal Mahuvakar, better known by her stage name Rupini, is an Indian actress who has appeared in Hindi, Tamil, Kannada, Malayalam, and Telugu language films during the late 1980s and early 1990s. She started as a child artist in the Hindi film Mili.

She acted in Tamil, Kannada, Telugu and Malayalam films with stars including Rajinikanth, Kamal Haasan, Mohanlal, Mammootty, Venkatesh, Balakrishna, Jagadish, Sathyaraj, Vijayakanth, Dr. Vishnuvardhan, V Ravichandran, Mukesh, Mohan and Ramarajan.

Rupini, originally from Mumbai, moved to the south to act in films after the late 1980s. Earlier, she had acted under her real name in a few Hindi films, including Des Pardes, Payal Ki Jhankaar, Meri Adalat, Sanch Ko Aanch Nahin and Nache Mayuri. Beside acting, she is also an Indian classical dancer and has founded the Sparsha Foundation for special children.

Early life and debut
Mahuvakar was born in Mumbai into a well educated family. Her father was a lawyer and her mother was a dietitian.

She was accidentally spotted by the film-maker Hrishikesh Mukherjee who offered her child roles in his films such as Mili, Kotwal Saab and Khubsoorat.

Filmography

Tamil

Malayalam

Hindi

Kannada

Telugu

Television

References

External links
 
 

Year of birth missing (living people)
Living people
Indian film actresses
Indian child actresses
20th-century Indian actresses
Actresses from Mumbai
Actresses in Hindi cinema
Actresses in Kannada cinema
Actresses in Malayalam cinema
Actresses in Tamil cinema
Actresses in Telugu cinema